Sláva Doseděl was the defending champion, but the eight seeded Czech lost in the quarterfinals to qualifier Mariano Zabaleta. Magnus Norman won in the final 6–3, 6–3, 2–6, 6–4 against number six seed Richard Fromberg and captured the second title of his professional career.

Seeds
Champion seeds are indicated in bold while text in italics indicates the round in which that seed was eliminated.

Draw

Finals

Section 1

Section 2

References

External links
 ATP main draw

Singles